Kalulushi Modern Stars is a Zambian football club. They play in division one - North of Zambian football, the Zambian League. Independence Stadium in Kalulushi, which has a capacity of 8,000, is their home. The club was formed after a split of the then Kalulushi Babes Football Club founded in 1962 into Kalulushi Modern Stars comprising mine employees  and 11 Wise-men  for municipal community in 1964? The two teams were both in division two.

Kalulushi Modern Stars FC won promotion to the top league then in Division 1 in 1969 after winning the league in Division 2 in 1968. A few other teams in Division 1 included Rhokana Utd, Bancroft Blades, Roan Utd, Mufulira Wanderers and Kabwe Warriors. However the team was demoted to Division 2 in 1971 but again won promotion to Division 1 in 1980.  However, the league was re-structured to introduce the Super Division as the top league. The top 12 teams of the 18 teams in then top Division 1 comprised the Premier league. The remaining 6 teams in old Division 1 remained in the new Division 1 and were joined by the top 6 teams from Division 2 were Kalulushi Modern Stars FC topped the league. The new Division 2 comprised the bottom 6 teams from old Division 1 and top 6 teams from old Division 2. The remaining bottom 6 teams in old Division 2 were demoted to Division 3.	

In 1983, Kalulushi Modern Stars FC first won promotion to Super Division. The team was demoted to Division 1 in 1996. Since then the team only got promoted to Super Division in 1997 and 2013. It remained in Division 1 and was even demoted to Division 2 in 2000.  Currently, the team is in Division 1-North and after playing 17 games of the 34, it lies on second position with 33 points. The team aims for promotion to Super Division in 2016 season.

External links
Club logo

Football clubs in Zambia